Animal Farm is an English-language opera by Russian composer Alexander Raskatov based on George Orwell's 1944 novella. The opera contains two acts, nine scenes, and an epilogue, with a libretto written by Ian Burton and musical direction by Bassem Akiki. The project was conceived by Italian director Damiano Michieletto who collaborated with Raskatov on the project which was a co-commission by the Vienna State Opera,  Teatro Massimo, and the Dutch National Opera. The opera's premiere took place on March 3, 2023 as part of Dutch National Opera's 2022/2023 season and has been welcomed with great success by the audience.

Cast

References 

Operas based on novels
2023 operas
English-language operas
Adaptations of works by George Orwell
Operas